Hypocaccus is a genus of clown beetles in the family Histeridae. There are more than 120 described species in Hypocaccus.

See also
 List of Hypocaccus species

References

Further reading

External links

 

Histeridae
Articles created by Qbugbot